The South School is a historic school building in Stoneham, Massachusetts. It is the best preserved 19th century schoolhouse in Stoneham. The two-story wood-frame building housed two classrooms on each of its two floors, and was built c. 1857–58, at a time when many schoolhouses in the state were typically single story buildings with one or two classrooms. The building saw academic use well into the 20th century before being converted to other uses. It has retained its basic form, as well exterior Italianate features.

The building was listed on the National Register of Historic Places in 1984. It presently houses community social services agencies.

See also
 National Register of Historic Places listings in Stoneham, Massachusetts
 National Register of Historic Places listings in Middlesex County, Massachusetts

References

Buildings and structures in Stoneham, Massachusetts
School buildings on the National Register of Historic Places in Massachusetts
National Register of Historic Places in Stoneham, Massachusetts
1857 establishments in Massachusetts